1895 is a 1995 Estonian animated film directed by Priit Pärn and Janno Põldma.

The film is dedicated to the 100th anniversary of cinema. The film speaks about brothers Auguste and Louis Lumière, presenting new facts and events.

Awards:
 1995: Estonian State Cultural Award
 1995: CINANIMA - International Animated Film Festival (Espinho, Portugal), C-category award by the jury
 1996: Oslo Animation Festival, Best Film
 1996: ANIMAFEST ZAGREB - World Festival of Animated Film (Croatia), Grand Prix

References

External links
 
 1895, entry in Estonian Film Database (EFIS)

1995 films
Estonian animated films